Hoskinston is an unincorporated community in Leslie County, Kentucky, United States.

A post office was established in 1887 and named for is first postmaster, Carlo Hoskins.

References

Unincorporated communities in Leslie County, Kentucky
Unincorporated communities in Kentucky